The 2019–20 North Dakota Fighting Hawks men's basketball team represented the University of North Dakota in the 2019–20 NCAA Division I men's basketball season. The Fighting Hawks, led by first-year head coach Paul Sather, played their home games at the Betty Engelstad Sioux Center in Grand Forks, North Dakota as members of the Summit League. They finished the season 15–18, 7–9 in Summit League play to finish in sixth place. They defeated South Dakota and Purdue Fort Wayne to advance to the championship game of the Summit League tournament where they lost to North Dakota State.

Previous season
The Fighting Hawks finished the 2018–19 season 12–18 overall, 6–10 in Summit League play, to finish in 7th place. In the Summit League tournament, they were defeated by Omaha in the quarterfinals.

On May 1, 2019, it was announced that head coach Brian Jones, who had led the team for the past 13 years, was stepping down, in order to take the associate head coaching position at Illinois State. On May 30, head coach of DII Northern State, Paul Sather, was announced as Jones' replacement.

Roster

Schedule and results

|-
!colspan=12 style=| Non-conference regular season

|-
!colspan=9 style=| Summit League regular season

|-
!colspan=12 style=| Summit League tournament
|-

|-

Source

Notes

References

North Dakota Fighting Hawks men's basketball seasons
North Dakota Fighting Hawks
North Dakota Fighting Hawks men's basketball
North Dakota Fighting Hawks men's basketball